Hazelhurst Arts Centre, also known as Hazelhurst Regional Gallery & Arts Centre, Hazelhurst Gallery and Hazelhurst, is an arts complex located on Kingsway in the suburb of Gymea, in southern Sydney, New South Wales, Australia. The complex includes two art galleries, a theatrette, art studios, meeting rooms, gift shop and café as well as the gardens. The facility is also available for hire as a function centre. Hazelhurst opened on 22 January 2000. Architects for the building were Michael Bennet (of Jackson, Teece, Chesterman, Willis) in partnership with Esther and Trevor Hayter. The garden designs were by Oi Choong.

History
Hazelhurst is an initiative of the Sutherland Shire Council and was created by the bequest of Ben and Hazel Broadhurst. The land that became Hazelhurst was secured in 1945, where a two-storey cottage, designed with the help of local architect Harry Smith, was built. The cottage is now used as Hazelhurst's artist-in-residence and digital media studio.

Gallery

References

External links
 

Arts centres in Australia
Art museums and galleries in Sydney
Art museums established in 2000
2000 establishments in Australia